Pedro Alejandro García de la Cruz (born 14 March 1974 in Pisco) is a Peruvian former footballer who previously played for Alfonso Ugarte.

Club career
García previously played for Universidad San Martín and Universitario de Deportes.

In January 2012, García had his contract with Universitario de Deportes rescinded by the Peruvian Football Federation due to 7 months of unpaid wages. He joined León de Huánuco along with former Universitario teammate Johan Vásquez for the start of the 2012 Torneo Descentralizado season.

International career
García has made 19 appearances for the Peru national football team, including the Copa América 2007.

Honours

Club
Universidad San Martín
 Torneo Descentralizado: 2007, 2008, 2010

References

External links

1974 births
Living people
People from Pisco, Peru
Peruvian footballers
Peru international footballers
Peruvian Primera División players
Club Alianza Lima footballers
U América F.C. footballers
Club Alcides Vigo footballers
Alianza Atlético footballers
Club Deportivo Universidad de San Martín de Porres players
Club Universitario de Deportes footballers
León de Huánuco footballers
Association football midfielders
2001 Copa América players
2004 Copa América players
2007 Copa América players